Encounter Bay  is a large bay on the south coast of Australia.

Encounter Bay  may also refer to:

Encounter Bay, South Australia, a  locality in the City of Victor Harbor
Encounter Bay Football Club, an Australian Rules football club  in South Australia
Electoral district of Encounter Bay, a former electoral district in South Australia
District Council of Encounter Bay, a former local government area in South Australia which merged to form the City of Victor Harbor
Hundred of Encounter Bay, a cadastral unit  in South Australia

See also

Encounter (disambiguation)